"Squaws Along the Yukon" is a song written by Cam Lewis, popularized in 1958 by Hank Thompson, and released in July 1958 on the Capitol label. An earlier version of the song, released in the 1940s, was recorded by Texas Jim Lewis and His Lone Star Cowboys.

Lyrics
The song's lyrics describe a relationship between a white man and a "salmon-colored" native girl who lives along the Yukon. She makes her underwear from hides of grizzly bear and bathes in ice-cold water every day. He loves to touch her skin, but her fur-lined parka gets in the way. The song repeats the phrase "ooga ooga mushka" which, per the song, means "I love you." The chorus recites: "The squaws along the Yukon are good enough for me."

Chart performance
In August 1958, it peaked at No. 2 on Billboards country and western chart. It spent 22 weeks on the charts and was also ranked No. 27 on Billboards 1958 year-end country and western chart.

Controversy
In 2015, Bear Family Records included the song on an album titled "Politically Incorrect", consisting of songs considered inappropriate by modern standards.

When the song was played in 2016 on the satellite radio channel "Willie's Roadhouse", a listener complained about the song's "misogynist and racial slurs." SiriusXM apologized for any offense caused by the "outdated and insensitive" references but defended the decision to play the song. The listener was not satisfied with the response and pursued a claim to the Canadian Broadcast Standards Council. The complaint resulted in a 2018 ruling that the SiriusXM breached Canadian broadcast standards by playing a song with  discriminatory, degrading and derogatory references to Indigenous women." The panel noted: In addition to the prominent use of the word “squaw”, references to a “salmon colored girl” and making underwear from the hides of grizzly bears, the nonsense language “Ooga ooga mooshka”, the line “The squaws along the Yukon are good enough for me”, and the paternalistic tone expressed throughout as exemplified by the line “Then I take her hand in mine and set her on my knee” combine to render the song all the more problematic.  Taken together, the noted elements of the song demean and belittle Indigenous women.

See also
 Billboard year-end top 50 country & western singles of 1958

References

Hank Thompson (musician) songs
1958 songs